Cândești may refer to several places in Romania:

 Cândești, Botoșani, a commune in Botoșani County
 Cândești, Dâmbovița, a commune in Dâmbovița County
 Cândești, Neamț, a commune in Neamț County
 Cândești, a village in Avram Iancu Commune, Alba County
 Cândești, a village in Albeștii de Muscel Commune, Argeș County
 Cândești, a village in Vernești Commune, Buzău County
 Cândești, a village in Dumbrăveni Commune, Vrancea County